

Canada

According to the CRTC, there are 18 UHF public television networks, 11 VHF public television networks, 19 UHF commercial television networks, 43 VHF commercial television networks, 22 UHF system television networks, and 5 VHF system television networks. These lists only cover broadcast stations.

 List of television stations in Alberta
 List of television stations in British Columbia
 List of television stations in Manitoba
 List of television stations in New Brunswick
 List of television stations in Newfoundland and Labrador
 List of television stations in Northwest Territories
 List of television stations in Nova Scotia
 List of television stations in Nunavut
 List of television stations in Ontario
 List of television stations in Prince Edward Island
 List of television stations in Quebec
 List of television stations in Saskatchewan
 List of television stations in Yukon

United States

According to the FCC, as of March 31, 2011, there are 1022 UHF commercial television stations, 360 VHF commercial television stations, 285 UHF educational television stations and 107 VHF educational television stations, plus 439 Class A UHF television stations, 76 Class A VHF television stations, 3043 UHF television translators, 1411 VHF television translators, 1656 UHF low-power television stations and 516 VHF low-power television stations. These lists only cover broadcast stations.

There are also many amateur television stations throughout the entire world.
 List of television stations in Alabama
 List of television stations in Alaska
 List of television stations in Arizona
 List of television stations in Arkansas
 List of television stations in California
 List of television stations in Colorado
 List of television stations in Connecticut
 List of television stations in Delaware
 List of television stations in Florida
 List of television stations in Georgia
 List of television stations in Hawaii
 List of television stations in Idaho
 List of television stations in Illinois
 List of television stations in Indiana
 List of television stations in Iowa
 List of television stations in Kansas
 List of television stations in Kentucky
 List of television stations in Louisiana
 List of television stations in Maine
 List of television stations in Maryland
 List of television stations in Massachusetts
 List of television stations in Michigan
 List of television stations in Minnesota
 List of television stations in Mississippi
 List of television stations in Missouri
 List of television stations in Montana
 List of television stations in Nebraska
 List of television stations in Nevada
 List of television stations in New Hampshire
 List of television stations in New Jersey
 List of television stations in New Mexico
 List of television stations in New York
 List of television stations in North Carolina
 List of television stations in North Dakota
 List of television stations in Ohio
 List of television stations in Oklahoma
 List of television stations in Oregon
 List of television stations in Pennsylvania
 List of television stations in Rhode Island
 List of television stations in South Carolina
 List of television stations in South Dakota
 List of television stations in Tennessee
 List of television stations in Texas
 List of television stations in Utah
 List of television stations in Vermont
 List of television stations in Virginia
 List of television stations in Washington (state)
 List of television stations in West Virginia
 List of television stations in Wisconsin
 List of television stations in Wyoming
 List of television stations in Washington, D.C.

Mexico

According to the IFT, as of June 21, 2017, there are, 411 commercial television networks, 52 educational television networks, 7 Regional television networks. and 183 State-level television networks.  These lists only cover broadcast stations.
Television stations in Aguascalientes
Television stations in Baja California
Television stations in Baja California Sur
Television stations in Campeche
Television stations in Chiapas
Television stations in Chihuahua
Television stations in Coahuila
Television stations in Colima
Television stations in Durango
Television stations in Guanajuato
Television stations in Guerrero
Television stations in Hidalgo
Television stations in Jalisco
Television stations in the State of Mexico
Television stations in Mexico City
Television stations in Michoacán
Television stations in Morelos
Television stations in Nayarit
Television stations in Nuevo León
Television stations in Oaxaca
Television stations in Puebla
Television stations in Querétaro
Television stations in Quintana Roo
Television stations in San Luis Potosí
Television stations in Sinaloa
Television stations in Sonora
Television stations in Tabasco
Television stations in Tamaulipas
Television stations in Tlaxcala
Television stations in Veracruz
Television stations in Yucatán
Television stations in Zacatecas

Central America

Costa Rica

 TITNS-TV: Conexión TV Canal 2
 TIIVS-TV: Repretel 4
 TITSR-TV: Teletica (moved to Channel 7?)
 TITV-TV: Repretel 6
 TITSR-TV: Teletica Canal 7
 TIDE-TV: Canal 9 teve (-Repretel- defunct; 1994-2000) (As Media -Outside Air-)
 TITEC-TV: TITEC-TV 10 (moved to Channel 13 and changed name to TISRN-TV?)
 TIBYK-TV: Repretel 11
 TISRN-TV: Canal 13
 TIUCR-TV: Canal 15 - UCR

El Salvador

 YSR-TV 2: Canal Dos - Telecorporacion Salvadoreña
 YSU-TV 4: Canal Cuatro - Telecorporacion Salvadoreña
 YSLA-TV 6: Canal Seis - Telecorporacion Salvadoreña
 YSWE-TV 8: Canal Ocho - Agape TV
 YSAL-TV 9: Canal Nueve - Legislative Assembly Channel
 YSWD-TV 10: Canal Diez - Televisión de El Salvador
 YSTU-TV 11: Canal Once - Red Salvadoreña de Medios
 YSWX-TV 12: Canal Doce - Red Salvadoreña de Medios
 YSJR-TV 15: Canal Quince - Grupo Megavision (Movie World)
 YSXL-TV 17: Canal Diecisiete - Independent/Youth Music Videos
 YSXW-TV 19: Canal Diecinueve - Grupo Megavision (News Channel)
 YSXO-TV 21: Canal Veintiuno - Grupo Megavision
 YSXY-TV 23: Canal Veintitrés - TVX (Independent)
 YSZX-TV 25: Canal Veinticinco - Órbita TV (TBN)
 YSWV-TV 27: Canal Veintisiete (religious)
 YSTP-TV 33: Canal Treinta y Tres - Francisco Gavidia University
 YSUT-TV 35: Canal Treinta y Cinco - Telecorporacion Salvadoreña
 YSNA-TV 57: Canal Católico (religious)
 YSMH-TV 65: El Canal de Jesus Cristo (CJC 65)
 YSAE-TV 67: TCI

Guatemala
 TGV-TV: 3 (Guatemala City)| 10: Canal 3 - El Súper Canal {Televisión Guatemalteca - Albavisión}
 TGCE-TV: 5 (Guatemala City) | 12: TV Maya {Academy of Mayan Languages of Guatemala}; formerly known as Cultural and Educational TV {Military Channel}
 TGVG-TV: 7 (Guatemala City)| 8: Televisiete {Televisión Guatemalteca - Albavisión}
 TGW-TV: 8 (Guatemala): Televisión Nacional (First television channel in the country, already disappeared) {Channel State}
 ====-TV: 9 (Guatemala City)| 4: Congress Channel -Outside Air-
 TGMO-TV: 11 (Guatemala City)| 6: TeleOnce {Televisión Guatemalteca - Albavisión}
 TGSS-TV: 13 (Guatemala City)| 2: TreceVision {Televisión Guatemalteca - Albavisión}
 Canal 19 HDTV (Guatemala City): Canal 3 El Súper Canal -Outside Air- {Televisión Guatemalteca - Albavisión}
 Canal 21 (Guatemala City): Enlace-TBN
 Canal 22 (San Marcos)
 Canal 27 (Guatemala City)| 28 and 66: El Canal de la Esperanza {Christian Ministry Grounds}
 Canal 29 (Guatemala City): Grupo Nuevo Mundo {Coming Soon} -Outside Air-
 Canal 31 (Guatemala City): Azteca, formerly known as Latitud Televisión
 Canal 33 (Guatemala City): TV-USAC
 Canal 35 (Guatemala City): Azteca
 Canal 40 (Petén): Corporación de Radio y Televisión Petenera, S. A.
 Canal 58 (suchitepequez) TVQ
 Canal 61 (Guatemala City): Enlace Juvenil
 Canal 63 (Guatemala City): Channel Archdiocese of Guatemala
 Canal 65 (Guatemala City): Family TV; formerly known as EWTN and TV Light {Catholic Channel}

Cable or Satellite Channels
 Guatevision "Un canal como debe ser"
 Canal Antigua: "Mira sin límites"
 18-50 Televisión: "Diferente"
 VEA Canal:"Vida, Ecología y Ambiente"
 Región + (Quetzaltenango)

Honduras

 HRJS-TV 2: Vica Television
 HRXN-TV 2: Tele Ceiba
 HRCV-TV 3/7: Telesistema 3/Telesistema 7 - El Lider
 HRLP-TV 4/7: Telecadena
 HRTG-TV 5: Canal5 - El Lider
 HRJG-TV 6: Canal 6
 Canal 8 Honduras
 HRTS-TV 7:
 HRJS-TV 9: Vica Television
 HRNQ-TV 13: Cruceña de TV
 Canal 11
 Canal 48 - El Canal de la Solidaridad
 JBN
 Maya TV
 Pueblovision Canal 36
 SOTEL Canal 11
 TEN

Nicaragua

 YNTC-TV 2: Televicentro
 YNTM-TV 4: Canal 4
 YNSA-TV 6: SSTV (defunct; 1979-1990)
 YNSA-TV 7: SSTV (defunct; 1979-1990)
 YN??-TV 8: Telenica
 YNSA-TV 9: SSTV (defunct; 1979-1990)
 YN??-TV 10: Canal 10
 YN??-TV 11: ESTV
 YNLG-TV 12: Nicavisión
 YNSA-TV 13: SSTV (defunct; 1979-1990)
 YN??-TV 17: Magic Channel
 YN??-TV 21: Enlace Nicaragua
 YN??-TV 23: CDNN 23
 YN??-TV 35: Telenorte Canal 35
 100% Noticias
 Atv98
 SNTV (defunct; 1990-1997)

Panama

 FETV Canal 5
 Hosana Visión Canal 37
 Mall Tv Canal 7
 + 23 Canal 23
 Mix Tv Canal 33
 Plus Canal 35
 Nex Canal 21
 RPC TV Canal 4
 SERTV Canal 11
 Telemetro Canal 13
 TVN Canal 2
 TVMax Canal 9
 Canal 29
Defunct Stations
 Panavision Canal 5
 SCN Canal 8
 Shop Tv Canal 33
 Telecinco Canal 5
 Tele7 Canal 7
 TVO Canal 21

Other areas
 List of Caribbean television channels, excluding Cuba and including French Guiana.
 List of television stations in Latin America

See also
 List of television stations in North America by media market
 Lists of companies – company-related list articles on Wikipedia

Television stations